More Heart Than Brains is the debut album by Bike for Three!, a collaboration between Canadian alternative hip hop artist Buck 65 (born Rich Terfry) and Belgian electronica producer Greetings from Tuskan (born Joëlle Phuong Minh Lê). It was released on May 26, 2009 on Anticon.

During the recording process, the two never met face-to-face.

Reception
At Metacritic, which assigns a weighted average score out of 100 to reviews from mainstream critics, the album received an average score of 82% based on 5 reviews, indicating "universal acclaim".

Pitchfork Media rated the album 7.5 out of 10, praising Terfry's "sharp lyrical details and storytelling" and calling Phuong Minh Lê's production "exquisite, shimmering landscape that rarely plays by the rules." XLR8R magazine called the track "All There is to Say About Love" "impressive", with "sharp rhymes falling over 8-bit-style electronics."

Track listing

References

External links
 

2009 debut albums
Anticon albums
Bike for Three! albums